Simone Mareuil (25 August 1903 – 24 October 1954) was a French actress best known for appearing in the surrealist film Un Chien Andalou.

Born Marie Louise Simone Vacher in Périgueux, Dordogne, she appeared in a number of films, most notably director Luis Buñuel's Un Chien Andalou (An Andalusian Dog, 1929). She was the second wife of actor Philippe Hersent.

After World War II, she returned to Périgueux, where she fell into a deep depression. She committed suicide by self-immolation — dousing herself in gasoline and burning herself to death in a public square.

Filmography

References

External links 

 
 

1903 births
1954 suicides
People from Périgueux
French film actresses
French silent film actresses
Suicides by self-immolation
Suicides in France
20th-century French actresses